The Samutprakarn Crocodile Farm and Zoo is a crocodile zoo in Samut Prakan Province, Thailand. Yai is one among over 100,000 crocodiles at the farm.

Visitors to the crocodile farm can see a wide variety of animals other than crocodiles, including elephants, lions, tigers, monkeys, great apes, horses and hippos. There are daily crocodile shows, famous for the performers doing tricks such as putting their heads and arms inside a crocodile's mouth. Elephant shows display the dexterity of elephants as they walk tightropes, ride skateboards and dance. Visitors may also take short elephant ride, ride a train, enjoy a paddle boat ride or explore the dinosaur museum.

Admission for non-Thai adults is 300 baht. Admission for children is 200 baht. Thai nationals pay 60 baht admission. Foreign-looking residents of Thailand still pay 300 baht. The Samutprakarn Crocodile Farm is located at 555 Moo 7 Taiban Road, Taiban Sub-District, Amphur Muang, Samutprakarn, Thailand. Opening hours are from 8:00 a.m. through 6:00 p.m. daily.

The farm shut down due to Covid-19 situation and went into liquidation in 2020.

Incidents

There have been at least three suicides at the facility—these involved women jumping into a crocodile pond and being eaten alive; there was such an incident in 2002 and a news report from the BBC makes reference to a similar occurrence a decade prior to this, and more recently in 2014.

A recent article published in The Washington Post alleges that the animals are exploited at the Samutprakarn Crocodile Farm and Zoo.

There was a recent article published by National Geographic reporting animal abuse and neglect, in particular concerning an elephant named Gluay Hom.

References 

Zoos in Thailand
Buildings and structures in Samut Prakan province
Crocodile farms
Tourist attractions in Samut Prakan province
Articles needing infobox zoo